Fentanyl/fluanisone (trade name Hypnorm) is a veterinary combination drug consisting of fentanyl (a potent synthetic narcotic analgesic with a rapid onset and short duration of action)  and fluanisone (a typical antipsychotic and sedative of the butyrophenone class) for use in mice, rats, rabbits and guinea pigs.

See also
 Hydrocodone/paracetamol
 Hydrocodone/ibuprofen
 Oxycodone/paracetamol
 Oxycodone/aspirin
 Oxycodone/naloxone
 Morphine/naltrexone

References

Veterinary drugs
Combination analgesics